Ronald Lee Gilman (born October 16, 1942 in Memphis, Tennessee) is a Senior United States circuit judge of the United States Court of Appeals for the Sixth Circuit.

Education and career

Gilman attended the Massachusetts Institute of Technology in 1964 and received a Scientiae Baccalaureus degree in Economics. In 1967, he obtained a Juris Doctor from Harvard Law School. Gilman privately practiced law in Memphis and became a professor at the University of Memphis School of Law in 1980. In 1988 he became an arbitrator and mediator at the American Arbitration Association. In 1993, Gilman became an arbitrator and mediator at the National Association of Securities Dealers. He was a referee at the Private Adjudication Center from 1993 to 1997.

Federal judicial service

Gilman was nominated to the United States Court of Appeals for the Sixth Circuit by Presiden Bill Clinton on July 16, 1997 after the seat had been vacated by Judge Herbert Theodore Milburn. On November 6, 1997, Gilman was confirmed by the United States Senate by a 98-1 vote, with Senator Lauch Faircloth being the lone senator voting against him. He received his commission on November 7, 1997. He assumed senior status on November 21, 2010.

Notable cases

In ACLU v. NSA, the Court of Appeals for the Sixth Circuit decided to vacate the District Court's decision that the extrajudicial electronic intercepts of the National Security Agency, where one party is within the U.S. and the other is outside, violated the law. The Court decided that the plaintiffs lacked standing. Judge Ronald Gilman wrote a long dissent, in which he argued that the plaintiffs did have standing, and that the Terrorist Surveillance Program as originally implemented violated the FISA.

Appeals judges Ronald Gilman, Gilbert Merritt, and Alan Eugene Norris unanimously reversed the decision of United States District Judge Thomas B. Russell, who had ruled in August 1997 against Jefferson County officials, therefore allowing county fiscal judges to regulate adult businesses.

References

Sources

1942 births
Harvard Law School alumni
Judges of the United States Court of Appeals for the Sixth Circuit
Living people
MIT School of Humanities, Arts, and Social Sciences alumni
People from Memphis, Tennessee
United States court of appeals judges appointed by Bill Clinton
University of Memphis faculty
20th-century American judges
21st-century American judges